Wayne State College (WSC) is a public college in Wayne, Nebraska. It is part of the Nebraska State College System and enrolls 4,202 students. The college opened as a public normal school in 1910 after the state purchased the private Nebraska Normal College (established 1891). The State Normal College became State Normal School and Teacher's College in 1921. This was changed to Nebraska State Teachers College at Wayne in 1949 and the present name was adopted in 1963.

Academics

Wayne State offers 130 different programs of study in four Schools:  Arts and Humanities, Business and Technology, Education and Counseling, and Natural and Social Sciences.  Wayne State also offers classes at Northeast Community College in Norfolk, Nebraska and through a satellite college in South Sioux City, Nebraska.

Athletics

Wayne State athletic teams are the Wildcats. The college is a member of the Division II level of the National Collegiate Athletic Association (NCAA), primarily competing in the Northern Sun Intercollegiate Conference (NSIC) in all sports since the 1999–2000 academic year. The Wildcats previously competed in the Central States Intercollegiate Conference (CSIC) of the National Association of Intercollegiate Athletics (NAIA) from 1976–77 to 1988–89; as well as in the Rocky Mountain Athletic Conference (RMAC) as a provisional member during the 1989–90 school year.

Wayne State competes in 15 intercollegiate varsity sports: Men's sports include baseball, basketball, cross country, football and track & field (indoor and outdoor); while women's sports include basketball, beach volleyball, cross country, golf, soccer, softball, track & field (indoor and outdoor) and volleyball.

History
The college began participating in athletics in 1912, when the football program began. Men's basketball and track and field began around the same time. These were the main sports up to World War II, when Wayne State was a member of the Nebraska Intercollegiate Athletic Association (NIAA). After World War II, the NIAA became the Nebraska College Conference (NCC) and Wayne State began to compete in baseball, cross country, golf, swimming, tennis, wrestling, and for a short period, boxing.

Notable alumni
 Thomas M. Carsey, Professor of Political Science 
 Byron Chamberlain, footbal player
 Lamart Cooper, football player
 Greg L. Adams, state senator and Speaker of the Nebraska Legislature.
 Charlie Janssen, state senator in the Nebraska Legislature.
 James Keogh, journalist and political adviser. Assistant managing editor of Time, Special Assistant to President Richard Nixon, Director, U.S. Information Agency. 
 Connie Kunzmann, basketball player
 John H. Kyl, member of the House of Representatives; Assistant Secretary, Dept. of the Interior, 1973–1977.
 Hilda Neihardt, historian.
 John Neihardt, Poet Laureate of Nebraska, author of Black Elk Speaks.
 Gale McGee, Democratic Senator from Wyoming 1959–1977. U.S. Ambassador to the Organization of American States.
 Ruben Mendoza, football player
 Brad Ottis, football player
 Val Peterson, Governor of Nebraska 1947–1953, Director of Federal Civil Defense Administration, Ambassador to Denmark and Finland. 
 Brett Salisbury, football player and author of The Transform Diet 
 Tom Sherlock, British Basketball League forward
 Kevin Swayne, football player 
 Brian Wansink, Cornell University professor and author of Mindless Eating: Why We Eat More Than We Think
 DaVarryl Williamson, football player 
 Norma Wendelburg, composer

See also
Wayne State College Arboretum

References

External links
 
 Official athletics website

 
Education in Wayne County, Nebraska
Nebraska State College System
Buildings and structures in Wayne County, Nebraska
Educational institutions established in 1910
1910 establishments in Nebraska
Public universities and colleges in Nebraska